Zimmerli is a surname. Notable people with the surname include:

Patrick Zimmerli
Sandra Zimmerli (born 1965), Swiss ski mountaineer and radio journalist
Walther Zimmerli (1907–1983), Swiss academic theologian

See also
Zimmerli Art Museum at Rutgers University

Swiss-German surnames